Elmer C. Johnson (January 23, 1910 – July 7, 1988) was an American professional basketball player and minor league baseball player. He played for the Chicago Bruins in the National Basketball League from 1939 to 1941 and averaged 2.8 points per game.

In baseball, Johnson played for seven different teams between 1934 and 1940. He was a relief pitcher.

References

1910 births
1988 deaths
American men's basketball players
Anniston Rams players
Baseball pitchers
Baseball players from Illinois
Basketball players from Illinois
Bloomington Bloomers players
Centers (basketball)
Chicago Bruins players
Crookston Pirates players
Forwards (basketball)
Northwestern Wildcats men's basketball players
San Diego Padres (minor league) players
San Francisco Seals (baseball) players
Selma Cloverleafs players
St. Paul Saints (AA) players